Miloš Marković (Cyrillic: Милош Марковић, born 28 April 1992) is a Montenegrin football midfielder who plays for FK Ibar.

References

External links
 

1992 births
Living people
Sportspeople from Cetinje
Association football midfielders
Montenegrin footballers
Győri ETO FC players
KF Skënderbeu Korçë players
FK Igalo 1929 players
FK Rudar Pljevlja players
FK Leotar players
FK Iskra Danilovgrad players
FK Podgorica players
FK Ibar Rožaje players
Nemzeti Bajnokság II players
Montenegrin Second League players
Premier League of Bosnia and Herzegovina players
Montenegrin expatriate footballers
Expatriate footballers in Hungary
Montenegrin expatriate sportspeople in Hungary
Expatriate footballers in Albania
Montenegrin expatriate sportspeople in Albania
Expatriate footballers in Bosnia and Herzegovina
Montenegrin expatriate sportspeople in Bosnia and Herzegovina